Hellcats is an American cheerleading comedy-drama television series that originally aired on The CW in the United States from September 8, 2010, to May 17, 2011. Based on the book Cheer: Inside the Secret World of College Cheerleaders by journalist Kate Torgovnick, the series focuses in the lives of college cheerleaders, mainly Marti Perkins (Aly Michalka), a pre-law college student who has to join the cheerleading team, the Hellcats, in order to get the athletic scholarship she needs. The main cast also includes Ashley Tisdale, Robbie Jones, Heather Hemmens, Matt Barr, Gail O'Grady, and Sharon Leal.

In May 2010, Hellcats had been picked by The CW for the fall 2010–11 season. Initially with a 13-episode order, The CW aired the series after America's Next Top Model on Wednesday nights. The pilot episode aired on September 8, 2010, and became the first premiere to ever match or build on an America's Next Top Model lead-in since The CW began in 2006. The CW later gave a full season order for the series, with executives saying they were "thrilled that it paid off for us". On May 17, 2011, The CW announced that Hellcats would not be renewed for the 2011 fall schedule.

Hellcats has been described as "Election meets Bring It On" by critics. It received mixed reviews during its first season, obtaining a Metacritic weighted average score of 51 percent, based on the impression of 22 critics. The series also earned a nomination in the 2011 People's Choice Awards.

Series overview
Hellcats follows Marti Perkins, a pre-law college student at Lancer University, who lost her scholarship and has no other choice but to join the college's cheer squad, the Hellcats, in order to obtain a new one. There she meets her new roommate and team captain Savannah Monroe, the injured flyer Alice Verdura, her new partner Lewis Flynn and the Hellcats coach Vanessa Lodge who hopes to win nationals, otherwise the cheer leading program will be cut. All the while, Marti also has to deal with her financially unstable and sometimes irresponsible mother, Wanda Perkins, whom she often has to bail out of difficult situations, and her best friend Dan Patch.

Cast and characters

Main Cast
Marti Perkins (Aly Michalka) is the protagonist of the series and a townie from Memphis, Tennessee. Described as "wicked smart", she is a pre-law student at Lancer University. Her mother, Wanda Perkins (Gail O'Grady), works at the university pub and is a party girl who never grew up. Her mother's behavior is, for the most part, an embarrassment to Marti. When Lancer's administrative department cuts scholarships for Lancer employees and families, Marti learns she can get a new one by choosing one of Lancer's programs. She then auditions for a position on Lancer's cheerleading team, the Hellcats.
Savannah Monroe (Ashley Tisdale), the captain of the Hellcats, is described as "peppy and petite" with a "fierce intensity". She initially clashes with Marti, but realizes she is the godsend that the Hellcats need to win the championship. She votes for Marti when the team has auditions for a new flyer. Savannah is from a very religious, upper-middle class southern family. After a fight with her family, she left the university she was attending, Memphis Christian, and transferred to secular Lancer. Her sister Charlotte, a recurring role played by Emma Lahana, is the captain of the Cyclones, the cheerleading team at Savannah's old school and a Hellcats' rival.
Alice (Heather Hemmens) is dangerously narcissistic and after she injures her wrist, she dislikes the idea of Marti replacing her on the squad, or the attention Marti receives from Alice's ex-boyfriend, Lewis Flynn.
Lewis (Robbie Jones) is one of the Hellcats' bases and is an easy-going guy who has a love for action. He was once a star on the Lancer football team but quit when he discovered a scandal of players being paid by the college. He tried out for the Hellcats team when his then-girlfriend Alice encouraged him to do so in order to gain scholarship money after the football scandal, and instantly became hooked. He has an instant attraction to Marti. They later start dating.
Dan Patch (Matt Barr) is a townie who is Marti's friend. He had an unspoken crush on her but now is dating Savannah, Marti's new friend on the team. He's of Irish descent with at least six siblings.
Wanda Perkins (Gail O'Grady), Marti's mother.
Vanessa Lodge (Sharon Leal) is a former Hellcat cheerleader who is now the team's coach. Her job is threatened if the Hellcats do not place at the national competition.

Supporting Cast 
Red Raymond (Jeff Hephner), the Lancer's football coach who shares a romantic past with Vanessa 
Deirdre Perkins (Amanda Joy Michalka), Marti's half-sister 
Derrick Altman (D. B. Woodside), a doctor who works at Lancer University and is now Vanessa's boyfriend
Bill Marsh (Aaron Douglas) is the college's athletic director who is still involved in a "pay for play" scandal with players that could get the school's programs (including the Hellcats) suspended
Morgan Pepper (Craig Anderson) is a pre-law student and Marti's classmate. He later befriends Marti and joins her to solve a legal case introduced by their teacher
Charlotte Munroe (Emma Lahana)
Julian (Gale Harold) 
Darwin (Jeremy Wong)
Frankie (Alana Randall)
Kathy (Magda Apanowicz) is a member of the Cyclones, usually called "Nasty Kathy".

Production

Development

Hellcats is based on the book Cheer: Inside the Secret World of College Cheerleaders by journalist Kate Torgovnick and the series has been described as "Election meets Bring It On". Actor Tom Welling teamed with Kevin Murphy to executive produce the series, which was initially given the name Cheer. The pilot episode was written by Murphy and directed by Allan Arkush. On May 18, 2010, The Hollywood Reporter, Variety and Entertainment Weekly reported that The CW had picked up the series for the 2010–2011 television season and confirmed that Paul Becker would be the head choreographer for the series. Tisdale's character was originally named Sierra Sloan but was renamed Savannah Monroe in the press release.

While presenting its 2010–11 season schedule on May 21, 2010, The CW officially confirmed the pick up of the series and announced its intention to air Hellcats after America's Next Top Model on Wednesday nights. TV Guide reported that Ashley Tisdale is the best paid of the cast, earning $30,000 per episode during the first season of the series.

During the 2010 Television Critics Association press tour in Los Angeles on July 29, 2010, producer Murphy said the series "was inspired by aspirational sports movies of the 1980s like Breaking Away, Vision Quest, and Pittsburgh-set Flashdance", and also added that "Hellcats is a show either for optimists or for people who are interested in learning the trade". Producer Welling said he was attracted to the series mainly because of the script, and he also felt the cheerleaders' world had not yet been tapped into on television. When asked why it picked up Hellcats, The CW replied saying the series is "one of the underdogs" and it liked the big production numbers.

The filming of the pilot episode took place in Vancouver, British Columbia, Canada between April 13–21, 2010. The filming of the next episodes of the first season began on July 14 in Vancouver. The cast had two weeks of rehearsal for the pilot episode but after the series' fall season pick up, they will only have a week to rehearse the dance numbers for each episode. Former Fame actress and choreographer Debbie Allen directed the episode "Pledging My Love".

The CW Network attempted to break the Guinness World Records mark for the "Largest Cheerleading Dance" at a single venue by inviting cheerleading squads to participate in a five-minute choreographed Hellcats dance in September 2010. The mark was not broken as there were not enough cheerleaders present.

Casting

On March 8, 2010, The Hollywood Reporter announced that Aly Michalka and Gail O'Grady were the first actresses to be cast in the series. Michalka would play the lead role of Marti Perkins, a college girl who decided to join the Hellcats, and O'Grady was to portray Wanda Perkins, Marti's mother. The site later announced that actress Ashley Tisdale was cast as Savannah Monroe (then known as Sierra Sloane), the fiercely intense captain of the Hellcats.

Matt Barr was cast as Dan Patch, a womanizer who quietly pines for Marti. On April 5, 2010, it was reported that actors Robbie Jones and Heather Hemmens were cast. Jones would portray the male lead, a cheerleading "base" who falls for Marti, and Hemmens to play a cheerleader sidelined with a wrist injury. On April 8, 2010, it was reported that actress Sharon Leal was cast as Vanessa Lodge, a former Hellcat star who now serves as the squad's coach. Elena Esovolva was cast as Patty "The Wedge" Wedgerman, a lesbian cheerleader and a base for the squad.

On April 14, 2010, it was announced that Ben Browder was cast as Red Raymond, Lancer University's football coach. On May 21, 2010, it was announced that the role was being recast and possibly retooled as well, although Browder had already shot scenes for the pilot episode. Raymond's role was later given to Jeff Hephner. On July 13, one day before the beginning of filming, D. B. Woodside was cast as Derrick Altman, a "handsome young physician who takes care of the Hellcats cheerleaders".

Producer Kevin Murphy confirmed that Gale Harold would guest star in the series as one of Marti's law professors. Michalka added that Harold would appear in the third episode of the first season and had a multiple-episode arc. In late November 2010, AJ Michalka was cast in a recurring role as a girl who works at a record store near Lancer University and befriends Marti. Camille Sullivan was added to the supporting cast in February 2011 to portray Red Reymond's ex-wife.

On January 18, 2011, it was announced that Esovolova would not be returning to the show. Michalka has said that it was difficult for the writers to incorporate her storylines with the others.

Music
During the 2010 Television Critics Association press tour held in Los Angeles on July 29, 2010, lead actresses Michalka and Tisdale were asked about the idea of singing on the show. They stated that they plan to keep their music careers separate from the series, although Michalka advised that she would sing in the fourth episode. In addition to that, Michalka's band 78violet recorded "Belong Here", which served as the theme song for Hellcats. It was later released into digital stores.

Executive producer Kevin Murphy confirmed in an interview that a soundtrack would be released for the series, which would include the theme song and other songs recorded for the series. He later added "So we are building a library of material. Once we have enough, we're gonna put it on iTunes and definitely do a soundtrack album."
Songs covered for the series include "The Letter" originally by The Box Tops, Sting's "Brand New Day", Squeeze's "Tempted" and The Go-Go's hit "We Got the Beat". Canadian singer Fefe Dobson recorded "Rockstar", an exclusive song for the series that was played during the "A World Full of Strangers" episode. "Rockstar" was ultimately released on the iTunes Deluxe Edition of Dobson's album Joy. As previously promised by Murphy, a digital EP featuring five of the songs recorded for the series was released on November 30, 2010, via WaterTower Music.

The first season of Hellcats also included live performances by guest musicians, including Hey Monday, Faber Drive, Fefe Dobson, 3OH!3 featuring Ashley Tisdale, Elise Estrada and Ciara.

Episodes
The first and only season of Hellcats consisted of 22 episodes. The pilot episode was broadcast on September 8, 2010. The initial order for the series was thirteen episodes. On September 23, 2010, due to successful ratings, The CW ordered six more scripts for the first season, although its production order was still at thirteen. On October 22, 2010, Variety announced that The CW had given a full season order for the series. The network said they took risks this year but they were "thrilled that they've paid off for us".

Hellcats aired on Wednesdays at 9–10 pm until December 1, 2010, when the eleventh episode aired. Starting January 25, 2011, The CW moved Hellcats to Tuesday nights at 9–10 pm, following One Tree Hill.

Reception

Critical reception
The show has received mixed reviews, with Metacritic giving it a score of 51 percent, based on reviews from 22 critics. It was praised and criticized by critics in several round-up reviews of 2010 in television. Los Angeles Times had a good first impression of the pilot episode, saying Hellcats has a predictable story but, on the other hand, Michalka and Tisdale seem perfect for their roles. The newspaper also wrote the cheerleading world portrayed in the series is a "fun and deep world to explore". The journal later gave a complete review of the series, comparing it to 1983's film Flashdance aimed squarely at audiences too young for Gossip Girl but too old for Hannah Montana.

Verne Gay of Newsday praised Michalka's performance in the series, while The Hollywood Reporter praised the series itself and said it has "multilayered characters that defy expectations".
Mara Reinstein of Us Weekly gave an early review of the first episode of the series, saying Hellcats has "plenty of winning elements" but added that the series lacks spirit. She also praised the performance and Marti's relationship with her mother.
ABC News listed Hellcats as one of the ten best new shows of 2010's fall season and described the series as "almost laughably formulaic" and added it "works like a charm".
Brian Lowry of Variety praised the series' promise, and said that the series has a Glee-like element in the script, while also criticizing Michalka and acclaiming O'Grady's performance. Lowry also added Hellcats premiere "isn't quite unabashedly trashy enough to completely qualify as a guilty pleasure".

Curt Wagner of ChicagoNow said the series is predictable and has unrealistic situations, and criticized the lack of fun in the jokes. The journal also praised Tisdale's performance, claiming she was the one who made him laugh the most. 
Alessandra Stanley of The New York Times criticized Michalka's performance and called the series a "soft-porn music video for teenagers". Washington Post'''s Hank Stuever was critical about the pilot episode, describing it as "mean-spirited, painfully dumb and badly acted". He also wrote Hellcats is the opposite to Fox's Glee.

Ratings
The pilot episode "A World Full of Strangers" averaged a total of 3.0 million viewers and scored a 2.0 rating in the network's target audience of women 18–34, which marks the first premiere to ever match or build on an America's Next Top Model lead-in since The CW began. Hellcats also delivered the largest non-Top Model performance in The CW's Wednesday 9–10 pm time period in 3 years since the Gossip Girl series premiere. On September 10, the network aired an encore of the pilot episode which averaged a total of 2.42 million viewers and won the hour with adults 18–49.Hellcats delivered The CW's most watched Tuesday of the season with 2.2 million viewers watching "Papa, Oh Papa", its 12th episode and the first in its new Tuesday 9–10 pm timeslot. Ratings fell rapidly as the series progressed, with the nineteenth episode, "Before I Was Caught", hitting a series low, with less than a million viewers watching it on April 27, 2011. The finale was watched by 1.16 million viewers.

The series averaged 2.11 million viewers with live +7 day DVR viewing.

Awards and nominations

Broadcast
While presenting its 2010–11 season schedule on May 21, 2010, The CW announced its intention to air Hellcats in the United States after America's Next Top Model on Wednesday nights starting September 8, 2010, at 9 pm. The series moved to Tuesday nights in the 9–10 pm timeslot, starting with the twelfth episode. Hellcats'' has been syndicated for broadcast in several countries worldwide, including Australia, Canada, Greece, Ireland, Israel, United Kingdom, Brazil, Spain, the Arab World, Latin-America, New Zealand, and Denmark.

Cancellation and possible reboot 

According to the producer, Tom Welling, he states that the reason of cancellation was due to the change of CW president of entertainment from Dawn Ostroff to Mark Pedowitz. He also said that there was a possibility of a reboot of the series with a new cast and cameos from the previous cast if enough fans continue to watch the original series on CW Seed.

Streaming
The series is available to stream on The CW's free digital-only network, CW Seed.

References

External links
 

2010 American television series debuts
2011 American television series endings
2010s American college television series
2010s American comedy-drama television series
2010s American teen drama television series
Aly & AJ
English-language television shows
Cheerleading television series
The CW original programming
Teenage pregnancy in television
Television series about teenagers
Television series by CBS Studios
Television series by Warner Bros. Television Studios
Television shows filmed in Vancouver
Television shows set in Tennessee